Kamen Rider Saber Spin-Off: Kamen Rider Sabela & Durendal (仮面ライダーセイバー（聖刃）スピンオフ 仮面ライダーサーベラ＆デュランダル, Kamen Raidā Seibā Hijiri Ha Supin'Ofu Kamen Raidā Sābera Ando Deyurandaru) is a Japanese superhero tokusatsu short film and a spin-off of Kamen Rider Saber television series.

Plot 
One year has passed after battle days of Sword of Logos ended. Reika Shindai is preparing for her upcoming wedding. However, this happiness is unexpectedly abrupted when her brother, Ryoga Shindai, discovers some disturbing secrets behind the scenes.

Cast 
Mei Angela as Reika Shindai/Kamen Rider Sabela
Ken Shonozaki as Ryoga Shindai/Kamen Rider Durendal
Hiroshi Yazaki as Rui Mitarai
Yuki Ikushima as Ryo Ogami/Kamen Rider Buster
Tenta Banka as Sora Ogami
Arisa Nakajima as Haruka Ogami
Yume Miyamoto as servant lady
Allen Mary Claire
Eiji Togashi as Ren Akamichi/Kamen Rider Kenzan

Release

Marketing 
The first footage from the movie was shown on YouTube  on October 30, 2022 under the title «Reika Shindai gets married!». The first full trailer of the movie was released on October 6 of the same year, unveiling the movie's title and announcing the release date.

Digital 
Kamen Rider Saber Spin-Off: Kamen Rider Sabela & Durendal was released on Toei Tokusatsu Fan Club on November 20, 2022.

References 

2022 films
2020s superhero films
Kamen Rider films
2020s Japanese superhero films
2022 fantasy films
2022 action adventure films
2022 action drama films
2020s Japanese-language films